The 2013–14 Alexela Korvpalli Meistriliiga was the 89th season of the Estonian basketball league and the first under the title sponsorship of Alexela. Kalev/Cramo came into the season as defending champions of the 2012–13 KML season.

The season started on 27 September 2013 and concluded on 21 May 2014 with Kalev/Cramo defeating TÜ/Rock 4 games to 0 in the 2014 KML Finals to win their 7th Estonian League title.

Teams

Coaching changes

Regular season
During the regular season teams will play 4 rounds for 32 games (2 at home and 2 away) with following exceptions:

 Kalev/Cramo will play 1 round at home against teams other than TÜ/Rock (1 round at home and 2 rounds away in total).
 TÜ/Rock will play 1 round at home against teams other than Kalev/Cramo (1 round at home and 2 rounds away in total).

Double points will be awarded to teams winning those games.

League table

First half of the season

Second half of the season

Playoffs

The playoffs began on 16 April and ended on 21 May. The tournament concluded with Kalev/Cramo defeating TÜ/Rock 4 games to 0 in the 2014 KML Finals.

Bracket

Individual statistics
Players qualify to this category by having at least 50% games played.

Points

Rebounds

Assists

Awards

MVP
  Vlad Moldoveanu (Kalev/Cramo)

Finals MVP
  Vlad Moldoveanu (Kalev/Cramo)

Best Defender
  Gregor Arbet (Kalev/Cramo)

Best Young Player
  Sander Saare (Rakvere Tarvas)

Coach of the Year
  Alar Varrak (Kalev/Cramo)

All-KML team

Player of the Month

See also
 2013–14 Eurocup Basketball
 2013–14 EuroChallenge
 2013–14 VTB United League
 2013–14 Baltic Basketball League

References

External links
Official website 

Korvpalli Meistriliiga seasons
Estonian
KML